Bebeji  is a Local Government Area in Kano State, Nigeria. Its headquarters are in the town of Bebeji.

It has an area of 717 km and a population of 188,859 at the 2006 census.

The postal code of the area is 711.

Geography
The town of Bebeji is located 45 km southwest of Kano, with an estimated population of 350,346.

It is in close proximity to Bagauda dam which supplies most of the potable water of Bebeji,  the federal government recently approved a dam in Bebeji to supplement the Bagauda dam sometimes known for its structural failures. Bebeji is also the location of Habe mosque, declared a monument in 1964. The town is known to have a significant occurrence of ilmenite, a weakly magnetic mineral containing titanium oxide. Alhaji Alhassan Dantata a prominent merchant in the early 1990s, and father to successful businessmen in the ancient city of Kano including late Alhaji Sanusi Dantata and Alhaji Aminu Dantata was born in the town of Bebeji in 1877.
Among the notable persons who resided and die in the town are: Alhaji Sani Babanyaya, Alhaji Amadu Dankofa et al.

Government
The current federal representative is Dr, Abdulmumin Jibrin Kofa a former commissioner in Kano State. The chairman of the Bebeji Local Government Area is Kantoma Bebeji.
Bebeji Local Government was created in 1990 during the administration of General Ibrahim Babangida.

References

Local Government Areas in Kano State